Kim Ji-yeon (born March 20, 1995), known professionally as Kei, is a South Korean singer and musical actress. She rose to fame as a member of South Korean girl group Lovelyz in November 2014. Kei officially made her solo debut with released EP on October 8, 2019 titled Over and Over. On November 16, 2021, she left Woollim Entertainment, although she remains as a member of Lovelyz. She joined Palm Tree Island in January 2022 to focus on her musical career, before moving to A2Z Entertainment later that year.

Biography
Kei was born Kim Ji-yeon on March 20, 1995 in Incheon, South Korea. She graduated from Incheon Youngsun High School.

Career

2014-2015: Debut with Lovelyz

In November 2014, Kei debuted as the main vocalist of girl group Lovelyz with the release of the debut studio album, Girls' Invasion. In December 2015, she recorded the song Love Is Like That for the drama Oh My Venus.

2016-2018: Solo activities
She was a contestant for JTBC's main vocal competition Girls Spirit in 2016, and was cast for a lead role in the web drama Matching! Boys Archery Club in the same year. On September 1, she released the collaborative song "Y". On October 26, she released a collaboration with The Solutions titled Beautiful as a part of HIGHGRND label project PLAYGRND.

In 2017, she made appearances on a variety of shows. She appeared on King of Mask Singer as the contestant "Agiley Mouse Jerry" for episodes 107–108. She also went on Duet Song Festival covering Kim Tae-yeon's song "I". Other shows she guested on was Running Man and Idol National Singing Competition.

On June 8, 2018, it was announced that Kei would be the new MC for Music Bank alongside actor Choi Won-myeong, starting from June 15.

2019-present: Solo debut and departure from Woollim

In 2019, she released the extended play (EP) Over and Over, under her real name Kim Ji-yeon. The album and the lead single "I Go" music video were released on October 8.

On November 1, 2021, Woollim Entertainment announced that Kei would not renew her contract and she left the company on November 16, 2021, following Lovelyz's disbandment.

On January 10, 2022, it was confirmed that Kei signed with Palm Tree Island, signaling her debut as a full time musical actress.

In May 2022, Kei released a ballad, R&B project's 11th single 'Star Road' featuring KozyPop (along with KozyPop), which will be released on May 29, 2022.

In July 2022 it was announced that Kei would hold a Kei from Kei fan meeting  on August 20, 2022; her first solo fan meeting since debut, as well as her first in-person fan meeting after debuting as a full time musical actress..

In December 2022, Kei signed with A2Z Ent (Pop Music) with the intention of releasing a solo music album.

Discography

Extended plays

Singles

As lead artist

Collaborations

Soundtrack appearances

Filmography

Web series

Web shows

Theatre

Notes

References

External links
 

1995 births
Living people
Woollim Entertainment artists
K-pop singers
South Korean female idols
South Korean women pop singers
21st-century South Korean actresses
21st-century South Korean singers
21st-century South Korean women singers
South Korean sopranos
Lovelyz members